Bonnemaisoniales is an order of red algae in the class Florideophyceae.

It includes 2 families;
 Bonnemaisoniaceae  - 25 spp.
 Naccariaceae  - 7 spp.

The order has cosmopolitan distribution.

References

External links
 
 

 
Red algae orders